On November 20, 1840, a special election was held in  to fill a vacancy caused by the death of William S. Ramsey on October 17 of the same year.

Election results

McClure took office on December 7, 1840, at the start of the 2nd session of the 26th Congress.

See also
List of special elections to the United States House of Representatives

References

Pennsylvania 1840 13
Pennsylvania 1840 13
1840 13
Pennsylvania 13
United States House of Representatives 13
United States House of Representatives 1840 13